KD Laksamana Tun Abdul Jamil (F135) is the second ship of Laksamana-class corvette currently in service with the Royal Malaysian Navy. She built by Fincantieri based on the Type 550 corvette design. Laksamana Tun Abdul Jamil constitute the Royal Malaysian Navy's 24th corvette Squadron.

Development

The Laksamana-class corvettes of the Royal Malaysian Navy are modified s built by Fincantieri, Italy. They were originally ordered by Iraqi Navy in February 1981. The corvettes were never delivered to Iraq and instead refitted and sold to Malaysia in mid 1990s.

Service history
Laksamana Tun Abdul Jamil were originally ordered by the Iraqi Navy as Saad Ibn Abi Wakkad (F218). Her keel was laid down on 17 September 1982, launched on 30 December 1983 and she was completed in 1988. Upon her completion, Saad Ibn Abi Wakkad was laid up at Muggiano due to trade embargo during Iran–Iraq War that prevented her from being delivered to Iraq. She was finally released for delivery in 1990, but as Iraq was again embargoed following its invasion of Kuwait, the ship was kept laid up by Fincantieri. It was proposed that she would be requisitioned by Italian Navy or sold to either Morocco or Colombia.

Royal Malaysian Navy signed a contract with Fincantieri for Saad Ibn Abi Wakkad and her sister Khalid Ibn Al Walid on 26 October 1995. She and her sister were refitted at Muggiano and later arrived in Malaysia in September 1997. The ship was commissioned as KD Laksamana Tun Abdul Jamil on 28 July 1997. RMN confirmed that she and other sister ships will be upgrade to extend their service life.

References

 
 
 

Corvette classes
Laksamana-class corvettes
Corvettes of Malaysia
Ships built by Fincantieri
1983 ships